The title Baron Mohun was created once in the Peerage of England. On 6 February 1299 John de Mohun was summoned to parliament. On the death of the second baron, the barony fell into abeyance. In 1431, Richard le Strange, 7th Baron Strange (second creation) became sole heir of the barony of Mohun; both these titles became abeyant on the death of Ferdinando Stanley, 5th Earl of Derby in 1594.

Barons Mohun (1299)

John de Mohun, 1st Baron Mohun (d. 1330)
John de Mohun, 2nd Baron Mohun (c. 1320–1375) abeyant 1375
Richard le Strange, 3rd Baron Mohun (1381–1449) sole heir 1431
for further barons look at Baron Strange (second creation) until 1594.

References

1299 establishments in England
Abeyant baronies in the Peerage of England
Noble titles created in 1299